Jordan Williams-Lambert (born May 9, 1994) is a gridiron football wide receiver who is a free agent. He was most recently a member of the Calgary Stampeders of the Canadian Football League (CFL). He played college football at Ball State where he was chosen for an All-MAC pick and selection.

College career 
During his college season, Williams-Lambert was chosen as a third-team All-MAC pick for the Ball State Cardinals in 2013 where he averaged 200 receptions for 2,723 yards for a 13.6 average in the rest of his career. Before he entered the 2015 NFL Draft, he was ranked fourth for most receptions and receiving yards for 24 TDs'.

Professional career

New Orleans Saints
Williams-Lambert signed with the New Orleans Saints as an undrafted free agent on May 2, 2016. He was waived by the Saints on September 3, 2016 and was signed to the practice squad the next day. After spending the entire season on the practice squad, Williams-Lambert signed a reserve/future contract with the Saints on January 2, 2017.

On August 9, 2017, Williams-Lambert was waived by the Saints and placed on injured reserve. He was released on August 11, 2017.

Saskatchewan Roughriders 
Williams-Lambert signed with the Saskatchewan Roughriders in time for the 2018 season. He played in 16 games for the Riders catching 62 passes for 764 yards with 4 touchdowns. On December 21, 2018, the Riders allowed Williams-Lambert to work out for NFL teams.

Chicago Bears
On January 18, 2019, Williams-Lambert signed a reserve/future contract with the Chicago Bears. He was waived on August 31, 2019.

Saskatchewan Roughriders (II)
On September 4, 2019, Williams-Lambert was added back to the roster of the Saskatchewan Roughriders. As part of his Memorandum of Agreement with the Riders, the CFL and the CFLPA in the event he was released by the Bears his right would automatically transfer back to the Riders. On September 10, 2019 Williams-Lambert and the Riders officially agreed on a contract extension, keeping him with the club through the 2020 season. He signed a one-year contract extension with the team on January 20, 2021. However, he played in only four games where he had 14 catches for 152 yards. He became a free agent upon the expiry of his contract on February 8, 2022.

Calgary Stampeders
On February 16, 2022, it was announced that Williams-Lambert had signed with the Calgary Stampeders. On May 29, 2022, the Stampeders released him following the first pre-season game.

Statistics

References

1994 births
Living people
Players of American football from Indianapolis
Players of Canadian football from Indianapolis
Players of American football from Chicago
Players of Canadian football from Chicago
American football wide receivers
Ball State Cardinals football players
New Orleans Saints players
Saskatchewan Roughriders players
Canadian football wide receivers
American players of Canadian football
Chicago Bears players
Calgary Stampeders players
Canadian Football League Rookie of the Year Award winners